Metro: The Official Bootleg Series, Volume 1 was released on July 22, 2010, as Metro Chicago celebrated its 28th anniversary by issuing a live benefit compilation album. It featured The Flaming Lips, Guided By Voices, Sleater-Kinney, The Decemberists, Indigo Girls, Alejandro Escovedo, The Sea and Cake, Tortoise, Alkaline Trio, Billy Corgan, Jimmy Chamberlin and Kurt Elling. Proceeds from the sale of the compilation CD benefited Rock For Kids.

Track listing

References

External links
 
 Metrochicago.com

2010 compilation albums
2010 live albums
Charity albums
Rock compilation albums